Leave It to Susan is a 1918 American silent comedy Western film directed by Clarence G. Badger and written by Rex Taylor and Irma Whipley Taylor.  The film stars Madge Kennedy, Wallace MacDonald, and Alfred Hollingsworth.

Cast list

References

External links
 

1918 films
1918 Western (genre) films
1918 comedy films
Films directed by Clarence G. Badger
1910s English-language films
1910s American films
Silent American Western (genre) comedy films
1910s Western (genre) comedy films